"Nameless" is the 16th episode and of the supernatural drama television series Grimm of season 2 and the 38th overall, which premiered on March 29, 2013, on NBC. The episode was written by Akela Cooper, and was directed by Charles Haid.

Plot
Opening quote: "Then he seized his left foot with both hands in such a fury that he split in two."

In a party celebrating the launch of a new game, Black Forest II, Brody Crawford (Quinn Franzen) is killed by a Wesen with an acid and his body is cut in half. Nick (David Giuntoli), Hank (Russell Hornsby) and Wu (Reggie Lee) investigate the scene and find something written with blood in the wall: "Play My Game".

Nick and Hank interrogate the head of administration of the video game, Dominick Spinner (Eric Lange) about Brody, as well as the other members, Jenna (Camille Chen) and Vicky (Beth Thompson). Suddenly, Jenna's phone rings and the voice in the other end utters the words in the wall. They track the call and discover is coming from Brody's office. They go to his office but find no one there. Instead, Brody's ID is cut and three books have the words: "What's", "My", and "Name".

Meanwhile, Juliette (Bitsie Tulloch) continues receiving the visions of Nick's ghost and asks Monroe (Silas Weir Mitchell) and Rosalee (Bree Turner) for help. Nick and Hank receive a tip from Spinner about Ridley Cooper, an ex-boyfriend of Jenna, before she began dating Brody. Ridley states he wasn't involved as he was playing the game during the events. He also tells them that Brody's avatar was killed the night before his death by a user named "Nameless", who also killed his avatar in the same way as his death.

Renard (Sasha Roiz) receives a call from his informant, who arrives in Portland to discuss the family. Vicky is called by the killer and when Nick and Hank get there, they find her body cut in half, an unsolved Sudoku puzzle and another message in the wall: "Guess my name". Wu solves the puzzle and finds a new pattern that details the day and time. Jenna deduces that an I.T. person is responsible for her involvement in the creation of the code for the video game.

While dining with his informant, Renard finds out there's an assassin in the restaurant and manages to find a bomb and throw it in the streets before detonating and killing the assassin. Nick and Hank find out they're dealing with a Fuchsteufelwild. After getting help from Spinner, Nick and Hank discover the killer is a man named Trinket Lipslums (Chris Murray). Jenna draws him out by killing his avatar in the game. Trinket is now pursued by the police and climbs to the rooftop of a building and, refusing to acknowledge he lost, jumps from the rooftop, killing himself.

Juliette demands from Monroe that he shows her Aunt Marie's trailer so she can find more about her memory. Monroe then tells Nick that if she won't be allowed to see the trailer, she will leave him and Portland for good.

Reception

Viewers
The episode was viewed by 4.86 million people, earning a 1.4/4 in the 18-49 rating demographics on the Nielson ratings scale, ranking second on its timeslot and sixth for the night in the 18-49 demographics, behind a rerun of 20/20, a game of NCAA basketball tournament between the Oregon Ducks and the Louisville Cardinals, Shark Tank, and another NCAA game between the Duke Blue Devils and the Michigan Wolverines. This was a 3% decrease in viewership from the previous episode, which was watched by 5.00 million viewers with a 1.4/4. This means that 1.4 percent of all households with televisions watched the episode, while 4 percent of all households watching television at that time watched it. With DVR factoring in, the episode was watched by 7.53 million viewers with a 2.5 ratings share in the 18-49 demographics.

Critical reviews
"Nameless" received mixed reviews. The A.V. Club's Kevin McFarland gave the episode a "C−" grade and wrote, "Let's not pussyfoot around this one: 'Nameless' is the worst episode of Grimms second season by a wide margin, on par with the disastrous Cinderella-inspired 'Happily Ever Aftermath' from almost a year ago. It’s a cheesy reworking of a character Once Upon A Time has used to significantly more successful effect, and it’s not often that I find myself resigned to admitting that."

Nick McHatton from TV Fanatic, gave a 3.8 star rating out of 5, stating: "'Nameless' is filled with plenty of interesting side stories and plot development, but Grimms procedural story is better left forgotten."

Shilo Adams from TV Overmind, wrote: "For a minute, I assumed that Spinner would be revealed to have played some role in the killings, but then I realized that Continuum did something like that this season. So many supernatural/sci-fi shows with procedural elements, you guys."

References

External links
 

Grimm (season 2) episodes
2013 American television episodes